Venturethree (stylized as venturethree, and formerly known as Venture3) is an independent brand company based in London, specialising in brand strategy, brand expression and brand experience.

History
venturethree was founded in London, in 1999 by Philip Orwell and Michael Zur-Szpiro. Before founding venturethree, Philip Orwell was a director at Wolff Olins. Michael Zur-Szpiro was the founder of Aroma Café, a chain of coffee shops, which was sold to McDonald's in 1999. Before that, Michael worked at Wolff Olins and Boston Consulting Group.

Paul Townsin and Graham Jones joined venturethree in 2001, also from Wolff Olins, where Paul Townsin was Creative Director. In the same year, the company moved into its Shepherd's Market studio, designed by Brinkworth, and expanding this Mayfair base in 2006.

In January 2013 the company moved to a new studio, designed by Ab Rogers Design, in the former Royal Military Asylum at the Duke of York's Headquarters in Chelsea, now known as Cavalry Square.

Work
venturethree works in many sectors including media, technology, retail, energy, corporate, culture and non-profit.

References

External links
Official Website

Branding companies of the United Kingdom
Companies based in the Royal Borough of Kensington and Chelsea
British companies established in 1999